Bailey Hall is a grade II* listed building in Hertford, Hertfordshire. It was originally a private home, then a school, then offices. It dates from around 1700 with 19th-century additions and is reputed to contain a tunnel, now blocked, to Hertford Castle. A previous house on the site was described as a manor house in 1621.

References

Grade II* listed buildings in Hertfordshire
Grade II* listed houses
Houses in Hertfordshire
Buildings and structures in Hertford